Mary Santpere (1913–1992) was a Spanish film and TV actress.

Selected filmography
 Gentleman Thief (1944)
 Unexpected Conflict (1948)
 Eleven Pairs of Boots (1954)
 The Fan (1958)
 La banda de los tres crisantemos (1970)
 May I Borrow Your Girl Tonight? (1978)
 National Heritage (1981)

References

Bibliography 
 Àngel Comas. Diccionari de llargmetratges: el cinema a Catalunya durant la Segona República, la Guerra Civil i el franquisme, (1930-1975). Cossetània Edicions, 2005.

External links 
 

1913 births
1992 deaths
Spanish film actresses
Film actresses from Catalonia
People from Barcelona